Carlo Romagnoli (30 October 1888 – 29 May 1965) was an Italian painter. His work was part of the painting event in the art competition at the 1936 Summer Olympics.

References

1888 births
1965 deaths
20th-century Italian painters
Italian male painters
Olympic competitors in art competitions
Painters from Rome
20th-century Italian male artists